Kers is a surname. Notable people with the surname include: 

Koos Jeroen Kers (born 1986), Dutch racing cyclist
Ronald Kers (born 1969), Dutch businessman
Robert De Kers (1906-1987), Belgian jazz trumpeter and bandleader

See also
 Ker (surname)
 Kinetic energy recovery system (KERS)